Michael Andre Smith II (born November 3, 1983) is an American politician. He is a Democrat representing District 41 in the Georgia House of Representatives.

Political career 

Smith was first elected to represent the 41st district in the Georgia House of Representatives in 2012. He has been re-elected to that position three times, and is running again in 2020.

Smith currently sits on the following committees:
 Code Revision
 Interstate Cooperation
 Regulated Industries
 Science and Technology
 Special Committee on Economic Growth
 Special Rules
 State Properties

Electoral record 

In 2014 and 2016, Smith was unopposed in the primary and general elections.

In 2018, Smith was unopposed in the Democratic primary.

References 

Living people
Democratic Party members of the Georgia House of Representatives
African-American state legislators in Georgia (U.S. state)
21st-century American politicians
21st-century African-American politicians
1983 births